Christopher Gardiner (born 5 January 1986 in Bellshill) is a Scottish football striker. Gardiner began his career with Heart of Midlothian, but failed to make an appearance for the first team. He had a 6-month loan spell with Clyde in 2005. He left Hearts in July 2005, and joined Elgin City, where he stayed for two seasons, before dropping out of the senior game to sign for Shotts Bon Accord.

See also
Clyde F.C. season 2004-05

References

External links

1986 births
Living people
Footballers from Bellshill
Scottish footballers
Clyde F.C. players
Heart of Midlothian F.C. players
Elgin City F.C. players
Shotts Bon Accord F.C. players
Scottish Football League players
Association football forwards